The 1917 Ohio State Buckeyes football team represented Ohio State University as a member of the Big Ten Conference and the Ohio Athletic Conference (OAC) during the 1917 college football season. Led by fifth-year head coach, John Wilce, the Buckeyes compiled an overall record of 8–0–1 and outscored opponents 292–6. Ohio State had a record of 4–0 against Big Ten opponents, winning the conference title for the second consecutive season.

Schedule

Coaching staff
 John Wilce, head coach, fifth year

References

Ohio State
Ohio State Buckeyes football seasons
Big Ten Conference football champion seasons
College football undefeated seasons
Ohio State Buckeyes football